Gu Achi Peak (O'odham: Ge Aji Doʼag) is a mountain in the Santa Rosa Mountains of Arizona. Gu Achi Peak can be translated as 'big ridge'. In precolonial times it was the central territory of the Totokwan group of the O'odham, and it may have served as the ceremonial center for the northern O'odham groups.

References 

Mountains of Arizona
Landforms of Pima County, Arizona
Mountains of Pima County, Arizona